"Minefields" is a song recorded by Moroccan-Canadian singer-songwriter Faouzia and American singer-songwriter John Legend, released as a digital single. The song’s lyrics were written by Faouzia and Ali Tamposi, while the musical composition was done by Charlie Puth, Sam Martin, Jeff Halatrax, and J-kash and production by Johnny Goldstein. , The song was released on October 29, 2020 by Atlantic Records and Artist Partner Group. The official music video premiered on January 28, 2021 via the official YouTube channel of Faouzia.

Composition 
The sentimental ballad song was structured in the key of C# minor and splendidly showcased Faouzia's upper belting range and Legend's baritone vocals. Faouzia's vocal range in the song spans from C#3 to G#5, three octaves sung interchangeably in chest and mixed registers. The lyrics expressed the grief of two lovers after parting ways and the need to come back as to what initially was. They have to walk through minefields to get to each other and as minefields were planted with explosive mines, they have to endeavour on the deadly odyssey as one tiny mistake of stepping on a mine would prompt them immediate death.

Track listing 
Digital
"Minefields"3:11
"Minefields (live acoustic)"3:13
"Minefields (Ofenbach remix)"3:49
"Minefields (Hook n Sling remix)"3:02

Charts 
The song peaked at number 45 on Canadian Billboard Digital Chart, at number 43 on French SNEP singles chart and on the Ultratip in French Belgian market peaking at number 44 in the bubbling under chart.

Credits and personnel 
Credits adapted from Tidal.

 Faouzia Ouhiya – vocals and writer
 John Legend - vocals
 Johnny Goldstein – producer, programmer and writer
 Tim McClain – engineer
 Chris Galland – mixing engineer
 Jeremie Inhaber – assistant mixing engineer
 Robin Florent – assistant mixing engineer
 Scott Desmarais – assistant mixing engineer
 Michelle Mancini – masterer
 Manny Marroquin – mixer
 Ali Tamposi – writer
 Charlie Puth – writer
 Sam Martin – writer
 Jeff Halatrax – writer
 J-kash – writer

References 

2020 singles
2020 songs
Atlantic Records singles
John Legend songs
Male–female vocal duets
Songs written by Ali Tamposi
Songs written by Charlie Puth
Songs written by Sam Martin (singer)